Nimbolouk District is a district (bakhsh) in Qaen County, South Khorasan Province, Iran. Its seat is Khezri dasht Bayaz At the 2016 census, its population was 20,870, in 5,400 families.  The District has two cities: Nimbolouk and Khezri Dasht Bayaz.  The District has two rural districts (dehestan): Korghond Rural District and Nimbolouk Rural District.

References 

Districts of South Khorasan Province
Qaen County